The Luiz Carlos Barreto de Carvalho Dam is an embankment dam on the Grande River near Fronteira in São Paulo, Brazil. The dam serves an associated hydroelectric power plant with a  installed capacity.

Background
Owned and maintained by Eletrobrás Furnas, they completed studies for the dam in 1962. Construction began in 1963 and was complete in March 1969 when the first generator went online. The dam and power plant were also inaugurated that year. Because of the Furnas Dam upstream, the water level in the reservoir is operated at similar levels year round. Furnas is currently planning to renovate and modernize the dam and power plant.

Specifications
In total, the spillway has a  discharge capacity.

Reservoir

Luiz Barreto Hydroelectric Power Plant

See also

List of power stations in Brazil

References

Dams completed in 1969
Dams in São Paulo (state)
Earth-filled dams
Dams on the Rio Grande (Paraná River tributary)